Cercosaura quadrilineata, the lined many-fingered teiid, is a species of lizard in the family Gymnophthalmidae. It is endemic to Brazil.

References

Cercosaura
Reptiles of Brazil
Endemic fauna of Brazil
Reptiles described in 1876
Taxa named by Oskar Boettger